Emilie Antonia of Oldenburg-Delmenhorst (15 June 1614 in Delmenhorst – 4 December 1670 in Rudolstadt), was Princess consort of Schwarzburg-Rudolstadt, and then regent of Schwarzburg-Rudolstadt during the minority of her son Albert Anton from 1646 to 1662.

Life 
Emilie was the daughter of Count Anthony II of Oldenburg and his wife Sibylle Elisabeth of Brunswick-Dannenberg.

She married on 4 February 1638 to Count Louis Günther I of Schwarzburg-Rudolstadt.  

When her husband died in 1646, she took up government as guardian and regent  for her son, Albert Anton.  She was 32 when she took up the regency, and ruled until her son came of age in 1662.

Emilie gave her children a religious education along the lines promoted by the Virtuous Society.  She hired the author Ahasverus Fritsch to act as her Hofmeister.  During her son's rule, Fritsch eventually rose to the post of Chancellor.

Emilie died on 4 December 1670 in Rudolstadt.

Issue
From her marriage to Louis Günther I of Schwarzburg-Rudolstadt, the following children were born:
 Sophie Juliane (1639-1672)
 Ludmilla Elisabeth (1640-1672)
 Albert Anton (1641-1710)
 Christiane Magdalene (1642-1672)
 Maria Susanna (1646-1688)

Ancestry

See also 
 House of Schwarzburg
 Schwarzburg-Rudolstadt

References 
 Friedrich Apfelstedt: Das Haus Kevernburg-Schwarzburg von seinem Ursprunge bis auf unsere Zeit: dargestellt in den Stammtafeln seiner Haupt- und Nebenlinien und mit biographischen Notizen über die wichtigsten Glieder derselben, Bertram, Sondershausen, 1890, 
 Horst Fleischer, Hans Herz, Lutz Unbehaun and Frank Esche: Die Grafen von Schwarzburg-Rudolstadt. Albrecht VII. bis Albert Anton, Thüringer Landesmuseum Heidecksburg, Rudolstadt, 2000, 

1614 births
1670 deaths
17th-century women rulers
Regents of Germany
German countesses
House of Oldenburg in Oldenburg
Emilie
17th-century German people